John Moffet may refer to:

John Moffet (politician) (1831–1884), Democratic member-elect of the U.S. House of Representatives from Pennsylvania
John Moffet (swimmer) (born 1964), American Olympic swimmer
John Moffet (director), movie director and co-director of Action Man: Robot Atak

See also
John Moffat (disambiguation)
John Moffatt (disambiguation)